Emerald Lake is located near Emerald village in the Nilgiris district in Tamil Nadu, India. It is located in a region called the silent valley, about 25 kilometers from the Ooty town.

Tourism
The lake is an important tourist and picnic spot in the region. The lake is famous for a variety of fish in the lake and birds in the locale. It is also notable for the scenic sun rise and sun set views near the lake. The lake is surrounded by tea plantations where visitors can buy tea products.

See also
 Ooty Lake
 Kamaraj Sagar Dam
 Adam's fountain
 Valley View, Ooty
 Avalanche Lake, Ooty

References

Tourist attractions in Nilgiris district
Reservoirs in Tamil Nadu